Richa (Aghul: Чӏаъ) is a rural locality (a selo) and the administrative centre of Richinsky Selsoviet, Agulsky District, Republic of Dagestan, Russia. The population was 1,267 as of 2010.

Geography 
Richa is located 9 km southwest of Tpig (the district's administrative centre) by road. Tpig is the nearest rural locality.

References 

Rural localities in Agulsky District